Chocolate-covered bacon is an American dish that consists of cooked bacon with a coating of either milk chocolate or dark chocolate. It can be topped with sea salt, crumbled pistachios, walnuts, or almond bits. References on the internet date back at least to 2005. The popularity of the dish has spread worldwide, and the dish has featured on television shows about food. A variant has been served at state fairs, where the bacon is served with chocolate sauce for dipping, and the dish has been developed into a gourmet food bar.

A similar food, called "Chocolate salo" originated in Ukraine. Candy manufacturer Confectionery Factory made an April Fool's Day version of the treat out of caramel and some rendered pork fat, giving a candy with a salty flavor similar to salo in chocolate.

Reception

Chocolate-covered bacon is sold as a specialty food across the United States. It appeared at the Minnesota State Fair under the name "Pig Lickers"; it is sold at the Santa Cruz Boardwalk in California and under the name "Pig Candy" by a chocolate maker in New York City.

The dish has appeared on the television show Dinner: Impossible as one of the foods served by chef Michael Symon as part of his "mission" to turn everyday boardwalk foods into a gourmet meal at the boardwalk in Wildwood, New Jersey.

Bacon was served with a chocolate dipping sauce at the 2009 Florida State Fair. Time magazine videotaped the making of a bacon bar.

Preparation and variations

Typically, streaky bacon is used to make chocolate-covered bacon, although other cuts may be used. It is first cooked and then immersed in melted chocolate; toppings (if any) are added, and the dish is allowed to cool. A variation is to dip the bacon in melted chocolate for a partial coating, leaving some of the bacon showing.

A British variation is to wrap a cube of chocolate in uncooked bacon, and to cook the bacon parcel in the oven as normal. The result is a hot bacon package, with a sweet melted chocolate center.

The recent popularity in the United States of bacon combined with sweet ingredients, caused by the quick (and sometimes viral) spreading of recipes in national media and on the Internet, has led to unexpected culinary inventions, such as candied bacon cubes, which are based on a recipe for "Candied bacon with whipped cream" printed in The New York Times, and bacon strips baked with brown sugar used as garnish for martinis.

See also

Bacon mania
Chicken fried bacon
Bacon explosion
List of chocolate-covered foods
2010s in food

References

Chocolate-covered foods
American desserts
Bacon dishes